Aleksandr Grigoryev (born 7 October 1955) is a former Belarusian high jumper who competed for the Soviet Union. He represented his country at the 1980 Moscow Olympics and was a seven-time Soviet champion. He was a medallist at the European Athletics Championships, IAAF World Cup and multiple times at the European Cup.

Born in Saint Petersburg, he was a member of the SK VS Minsk sports club in Belarus during his career. He was also fourth at the 1975 European Athletics Indoor Championships.

Grigoryev missed the 1976 season but reappeared in 1977 to win the Soviet title indoor and outdoors, as well as taking bronze medals at that year's Universiade and European Cup. He retained that outdoor title a year later and also broke the Soviet Athletics Championships record with  outdoors. In international competition he placed fourth at the 1978 European Athletics Indoor Championships, but won the highest honour of his career at the 1978 European Athletics Championships – a silver medal behind Soviet teammate and world record holder Vladimir Yashchenko.

A third straight national title outdoors came at the 1979 Soviet Spartakiad, seeing off a challenge from American Benn Fields. He was a bronze medallist in the high jump at both the 1979 European Cup and the 1979 IAAF World Cup. He gained selection for the Soviet Union at the 1980 Summer Olympics and reached eighth in the final on home turf. He took his final national title at the 1981 Soviet Championships.

International competitions

National titles
Soviet Athletics Championships
High jump: 1975, 1977, 1978, 1979, 1981
Soviet Indoor Athletics Championships
High jump: 1977, 1978

See also
List of European Athletics Championships medalists (men)
List of high jump national champions (men)

References

External links
All-Athletics profile

Living people
1955 births
Soviet male high jumpers
Belarusian male high jumpers
Olympic athletes of the Soviet Union
Athletes (track and field) at the 1980 Summer Olympics
European Athletics Championships medalists
Universiade medalists in athletics (track and field)
Universiade bronze medalists for the Soviet Union
Medalists at the 1977 Summer Universiade